No Trespassing is a lost 1922 American silent drama film directed by Edwin L. Hollywood and starring Irene Castle and Ward Crane. It was distributed by W. W. Hodkinson and is based upon a novel by Joseph C. Lincoln, The Rise of Roscoe Paine.

Plot
As described in a film magazine, Roscoe Paine (Crane), a wealthy young man with no job and little ambition who lives with his invalid mother (Barry) in a small fishing village, owns a lane leading to the shore which skirts the wealthy James Colton (Truesdale) property. Debutante Mabel Colton (Castle) and her father James and her mother (Fitzroy) are newly arrived to the village, and the passing of the fish carts on the lane annoys Mrs. Colton. The father thereupon tries to purchase the lane, but Roscoe refuses to close it to his friends and neighbors. Roscoe and Mabel become friends after he saves her from a runaway horse. Victor Carver (Roscoe), a suitor for Mabel's hand, attempts to ruin her father in a stock deal, but Roscoe engineers a counter stock deal during the illness of James, which saves his fortune. Roscoe also sells the lane to James Colton to raise money to save his friend George Davis (Pauncefort), a cashier at the local bank, from disgrace. The townspeople want to run Roscoe out of town until the truth is known and he is vindicated by Mabel and her father. Roscoe gets a good job in her father's offices, and he and Mabel get engaged.

Cast
Irene Castle as Mabel Colton
Howard Truesdale as James Colton
Emily Fitzroy as Mrs. James Colton
Ward Crane as Roscoe Paine
Eleanor Barry as Mrs. Paine
Blanche Frederici as Dorinda
Charles Eldridge as Lute
Leslie Stowe as Captain Dean 
Betty Bouton as Nellie Dean
Alan Roscoe as Victor Carver
Harry Fisher as Simeon Eldridge
George Pauncefort as George Davis

Reception
Variety gave No Trespassing a poor review: "This latest Castle feature cannot be relied upon as a real money-maker."

References

External links

Lantern slide (Wayback Machine)

1922 films
American black-and-white films
American silent feature films
Films based on American novels
Lost American films
Silent American drama films
1922 drama films
Films distributed by W. W. Hodkinson Corporation
1922 lost films
Lost drama films
Films directed by Edwin L. Hollywood
1920s American films